David Jason Muir (born November 8, 1973) is an American journalist and the anchor of ABC World News Tonight and co-anchor of the ABC News magazine 20/20, part of the news department of the ABC broadcast-television network, based in New York City. Muir previously served as the weekend anchor and primary substitute anchor on ABC's World News Tonight with Diane Sawyer succeeding her on September 1, 2014. At ABC News, Muir has won multiple Emmy and Edward R. Murrow awards for his national and international journalism.

According to the Tyndall Report, Muir's news reporting received the most airtime in 2012 and 2013. He has become one of the most visible journalists in America. As of 2019, World News Tonight with David Muir has become the most watched newscast in the United States.

Early life 
David Muir was born into a Catholic family in Syracuse, New York, and grew up in Onondaga Hill. Muir has one older sibling and two younger step-siblings, as well as six nieces and three nephews. As a child he watched ABC News' flagship program each night with his family and credits longtime anchor Peter Jennings as his biggest journalistic influence. He graduated from Onondaga Central Junior-Senior High School in May 1991 and attended local Ithaca College, graduating magna cum laude with a Bachelor of Arts degree in journalism in May 1995. During high school, he interned at WTVH-TV in Syracuse. While in college Muir was inspired by a professor who told him he had "the cut of a TV newsman." He spent a semester at the Institute on Political Journalism at the Fund for American Studies at Georgetown University and another semester abroad at the University of Salamanca in Spain with the Institute for the International Education of Students.

Career

WTVH television 
From 1994 to 2000, Muir worked as an anchor and a reporter at WTVH-TV in Syracuse, New York. Muir's reports from Jerusalem, Tel Aviv, Israel, and the Gaza Strip following the 1995 assassination of Israeli Prime Minister Yitzhak Rabin earned him top honors from the Radio-Television News Directors Association. The Associated Press honored Muir for Best Enterprise Reporting and Best Television Interview. The Syracuse Press Club recognized Muir as anchor of the "Best Local Newscast", and he was voted one of the "Best Local News Anchors" in Syracuse.

WCVB television 
From 2000 to 2003, Muir was an anchor and a reporter for WCVB television in Boston, where he won the regional Edward R. Murrow Award for investigative reporting and the National Headliner Award and Associated Press honors for his work tracing the path of the hijackers involved in the September 11, 2001 attacks. The Associated Press also recognized his news-anchoring and reporting.

ABC News 

In August 2003, Muir joined ABC News as anchor of the overnight news program World News Now. He also became anchor of ABC News' early morning newscast World News This Morning (America This Morning). Starting in June 2007, Muir was the anchor of World News Saturday. In 2006, and occasionally thereafter, he co-anchored the newsmagazine Primetime. In February 2012, Muir became anchor for the weekend newscasts, and the broadcast was named World News with David Muir. Muir has been silently credited with a rise in the ratings of the weekend evening broadcasts. In March 2013, Muir was promoted to co-anchor ABC's 20/20 with Elizabeth Vargas.

In September 2005, Muir was inside the New Orleans Superdome as Hurricane Katrina hit, and stayed in New Orleans to report on the unfolding humanitarian crisis. Muir's reports revealed and highlighted the deteriorating conditions inside the Convention Center and Charity Hospital, as Muir and his photographer waded through chest-deep waters for blocks to find patients trapped inside the hospital.

Muir reported from the Israeli-Lebanon border in October 2006 on the Israeli war with Hezbollah. Muir was in Gaza in March 2007 to cover the Hamas coup, reporting from inside the Gaza Strip. In October 2007, Muir was dispatched to Peru after the worst earthquake to hit that country in more than two decades.

In September 2008, Muir reported from Ukraine, more than two decades after the Chernobyl nuclear accident. In April 2009, David Muir and Diane Sawyer reported a 20/20 hour about guns in America getting "disturbing results" as described by the New York Daily News.

In May 2009, Muir's reporting on 20/20 revealed a significant increase in the number of homeless children in America. Muir made multiple trips to the Gulf of Mexico to investigate the BP oil spill. In April 2011, Muir reported from Haiti after the hurricane and returned to report on the attacks against women.

In January 2010, David traveled to Haiti in the wake of the devastating earthquake, which orphaned tens of thousands of children and destroyed the country's buildings and basic services. More than 220,000 people died, and many others were injured in the 7.0-magnitude quake. He has returned to Haiti multiple times since the earthquake hit, uncovering attacks on women and the unfolding mental health crisis in Port au Prince.

In June 2011, Muir reported from Tahrir Square during the political revolution in Egypt, and from Fukushima, Japan following the deadly tsunami and nuclear power plant accident. Muir wrote about his reporting from Mogadishu, Somalia, and his subsequent return, "Inside Somalia's Crippling Famine", for the Daily Beast. Muir also anchored several hours of the tragedy in Newtown as it unfolded, and then reported from the scene as President Obama visited the town. Muir also reported from the movie theater mass shootings in Aurora, Colorado; from Joplin, Missouri in the aftermath of a destructive tornado; and from Tucson, Arizona after the shooting of Congresswoman Gabby Giffords that left six others dead.

In November 2012, Muir served as one of ABC's lead correspondents for the 2012 U.S. Presidential election. Muir's interviews with Republican candidate Mitt Romney generated national headlines on the issues of economics and immigration policy in the United States. Muir's Emmy-nominated Made In America series on the American economy is a continuing feature on his broadcast. Muir has brought the series to other television programs, including ABC's The View, where he has served as guest co-host.

In January 2013, Muir reported from inside Iran, leading up to the nuclear talks. Muir was the first Western journalist to report from Mogadishu, Somalia on the famine. Muir and his team came under fire while reporting from Mogadishu. In 2013, he received the Edward R. Murrow Award for his reporting.

On June 27, 2014, ABC News announced that Muir would succeed Diane Sawyer as the anchor and managing editor of ABC World News. Muir made his debut broadcast on September 1, 2014. In April 2015, "World News Tonight with David Muir" became the country's most-watched evening newscast, outpacing NBC Nightly News for the first time since September 7, 2009.

In March 2016, Muir released a year-long report on the heroin crisis in America winning a CINE Golden Eagle Award for his reporting.

In 2021, Muir became the lead anchor of breaking news and special event coverage for ABC News, a role previously held by GMA anchor George Stephanopoulos from 2014 to 2020.

Honors 
Muir delivered the commencement address at Ithaca College in New York in May 2011; he urged graduates to use their voices. On March 13, 2015, the college awarded Muir, an alumnus, an honorary Doctor of Letters degree and the Jessica Savitch Award of Distinction for Excellence in Journalism.

In 2013, TV Week called Muir one of the "12 to Watch in TV News". He was listed as one of People magazine's Sexiest Men Alive in 2014.

On May 8, 2015, Muir delivered the commencement address at Northeastern University in Massachusetts. During the ceremony, he was given an honorary Doctor of Media degree.

On May 12, 2018, Muir delivered the commencement address at the University of Wisconsin-Madison in Madison, Wisconsin.

On May 15, 2022, Muir delivered the commencement address at Syracuse University in Syracuse, New York.

See also 
 New Yorkers in journalism

References

External links 
 ABC News: David Muir
 

1973 births
Living people
20th-century American journalists
21st-century American journalists
Disney people
ABC News personalities
American television news anchors
American male journalists
American television reporters and correspondents
Georgetown University alumni
Ithaca College alumni
Journalists from New York City
Television personalities from Syracuse, New York
University of Salamanca alumni